Walter Leighton Clark (1859–1935) was an American businessman, inventor, and artist based in Stockbridge, Massachusetts and New York City.

Biography

Among other achievements, in 1923 he founded with John Singer Sargent the Grand Central Art Galleries, located within New York City's Grand Central Terminal, to offer notable American artists the opportunity to exhibit their work in the United States without having to send it abroad. Together with sculptor Daniel Chester French and Dr. Austen Fox Riggs, Clark also played a central role in the founding of the Berkshire Theatre Festival in Stockbridge, Massachusetts. When the Stockbridge Casino, designed by Stanford White in 1887, fell into disuse, Clark, French, and Riggs purchased the building and had it moved to its current location. After renovations, the Berkshire Playhouse opened in 1928, and as the Berkshire Theatre Festival continues to be one of the region's centers of cultural life.

Raised a Quaker, Clark kept the telltale pronouns of that faith, using "thee," "thy" and "thou" even after decades of life in Manhattan and overseas.  His autobiography, "Leaves From an Artist's Memory," was published posthumously in 1937, reportedly having been dictated to his sister Emma Killé Clark, from his sick-bed. According to family oral history, she could be heard saying "Thee can't say that!" to him from time to time during the dictation. It is assumed he was telling stories that he shouldn't have, and the finished work has a scrubbed feeling that might be explained by this.

"Leaves" is essentially an account of Clark's boyhood adventures and subsequent rise from a machine-shop apprentice to industrialist and world traveler. In the book Clark detailed his friendships with Andrew Carnegie, John Singer Sargent, Thomas Edison, Charles Dana Gibson, Dame Ellen Terry, George Westinghouse, Julius Rosenwald, James A. Farrell, George Pullman, Thomas Hart Benton, and many others. During his time in Stockbridge he also studied sculpture with Daniel Chester French, and in 1916 acted as pallbearer for the funeral of Alexander Wilson Drake.

Clark died in Stockbridge, Massachusetts in 1935. He was staying at his sister's house, "The Roost," at the time, and was buried in Stockbridge Cemetery. His stone is engraved with the words of Edward Everett Hale: "Look up and not down; Look forward and not back; Look out and not in; And lend a hand."

Clark's collection

Clark collection sold
A New York Times clipping from May 13, 1936 details the sale of the estate of Walter Leighton Clark.  Items sold included two paintings: "Salome Receiving the Head of John the Baptist" by Bernardino Luini, sold for $1000, and Sir Anthony Van Dyck's "Portrait of Marten Rijckaert", sold for $720.  The latter currently resides in the Prado Museum in Madrid, Spain.

Recent sales
The most recent sale of his work was The Pooch sold by Christie's in New York in June 2007.

References

19th-century American painters
American male painters
20th-century American painters
1859 births
1935 deaths
American businesspeople
20th-century American inventors
20th-century American sculptors
19th-century American sculptors
19th-century American male artists
American male sculptors
20th-century American male artists